Stefan Kaltschütz (born 12 January 1978) is an Austrian snowboarder. He competed in the men's parallel giant slalom event at the 2002 Winter Olympics.

References

1978 births
Living people
Austrian male snowboarders
Olympic snowboarders of Austria
Snowboarders at the 2002 Winter Olympics
Sportspeople from Klagenfurt